Adventure Master was a system for writing text adventures with graphics. It was written by Christopher Chance and published by CBS Software in 1984. It ran on Apple II+/IIe/IIc, Atari, Commodore 64 and IBM Personal and PC/PCjr computers. It came with a few test adventures such as Clever Catacombs (by Christopher Chance), Becca in Outlaw Cave and Wild Trails (by the author Jean Craighead George).

References

1984 software
Interactive fiction
Text adventure game engines
Video game development software